Maximus Williamson (born 2006) is an American competitive swimmer. He is a 2022 Junior Pan Pacific Championships gold medalist in the 200 meter individual medley and silver medalist in the 200 meter freestyle, 400-meter individual medley, and 4×200 meter freestyle relay. In 2022, he became the fastest male American swimmer in history in the 15-16 age group in the long course 200 meter individual medley with a time of 1:59.01.

Background
Williamson was born in 2006. He attended Southlake Carroll in Southlake, Texas for his freshman year of high school, where he competed as part of the school swim team. After his freshman year, he transferred to Keller High School in Keller, Texas, starting his sophomore year the following school year, including competing for the school swim team, in the autumn of 2022. He trained and competed with the North Texas Nadadores swim club, based in Southlake, through 2022. Partway through 2022, he started training with Lakeside Aquatic Club, based in Lewisville, Texas, competing for the team at the 2022 Winter Junior US National Championships in December.

Career

2021
On July 23, at the 2021 Texas Age Group Swimming Championships in Arlington, Texas, 14-year-old Williamson swam a 1:53.26 in the 200 meter freestyle and set a new National Age Group record for the boys 13-14 age group, meaning he became the fastest male American performer in the event in history in the specified age range. Later in the year, as a 15-year-old at the 2021 Speedo Winter Junior National Championships in December in Austin, Texas, he won the 200 yard individual medley with a personal best time of 1:43.16. The following day of competition, he finished in a personal best time of 3:42.22 in the 400 yard individual medley to win the event and rank as the second-fastest male American swimmer in history in the 15-16 age group by 0.14 seconds.

2022
As a 15-year-old freshman competing for Southlake Carroll at his first Texas High School 6A State Championships, held at Lee and Joe Jamail Texas Swimming Center in Austin, Texas in February 2022, Williamson won individual titles in the 200 yard individual medley, with a new meet and state record of 1:43.70, and the 100 yard backstroke, with a 48.26, as well as relay titles in the 4×50 yard freestyle relay, where he split a 19.87 for the lead-off leg of the relay, and the 4×100 yard freestyle, on which he set a new meet and state record on the lead-off leg of the relay with a personal best time of 42.98 seconds. The following month, he won five individual titles at the 2022 Speedo Sectional Championship Series in College Station, Texas, including the 200 yard backstroke with a personal best time of 1:42.92, the 500 yard freestyle with a meet record and personal best time of 4:19.82, the 200 yard freestyle with a meet record and personal best time of 1:34.97, the 100 yard backstroke with a personal best time of 47.14 seconds, and the 50 yard freestyle with a personal best time of 19.84 seconds.

2022 US International Team Trials
In April, at the 2022 USA Swimming International Team Trials in Greensboro, North Carolina, Williamson placed eighth in the C-final of the 200 meter freestyle on the second day of competition with a 1:54.94. Later the same day, he won the B-final of the 200 meter backstroke with a personal best time of 1:58.75. The following day, he swam a 4:20.01 in the B-final of the 400 meter individual medley and placed second. On the fourth day, in the C-final of the 100 meter backstroke, he finished in a time of 56.57 seconds to placed sixth. Day five of five, he won the B-final of the 200 meter individual medley, finishing in a personal best time of 2:01.45, which ranked as the fastest time in the event by a 15-year-old male American swimmer. Over the five-day program, he also placed thirty-third in the 100 meter freestyle on day one with a time of 50.69 seconds and thirty-eighth in the 50 meter freestyle on day five with a 23.67.

Based on his performances, Williamson was named to the USA Swimming roster for the 2022 Junior Pan Pacific Swimming Championships in the 200-meter individual medley and 400 meter individual medley.

2022 Junior Pan Pacific Championships

The first day of competition at the 2022 Junior Pan Pacific Swimming Championships, conducted in August in Honolulu, Hawaii at Veterans Memorial Aquatic Center, Williamson started off with a tenth-place finish in the preliminary heats of the 100 meter backstroke with a personal best time of 55.83 seconds, before withdrawing from further competition in the event. Later in the day, in the final of the 200 meter freestyle, he won a silver medal with a personal best time of 1:48.21, finishing 1.10 seconds behind gold medalist Flynn Southam of Australia and 0.05 seconds ahead of bronze medalist Adam Wu of Canada. In his first final on day two, the 400 meter individual medley, he won the silver medal with a personal best time of 4:17.58, which was 2.35 seconds slower than gold medalist Ei Kamikawabata of Japan. For his second event, the 4×200 meter freestyle relay, he split a 1:49.68 for the fourth leg of the relay to help win the silver medal with a final time of 7:15.18.

On the evening of day three and morning of day four, Williamson won the B-final of the 200 meter backstroke with a 1:59.95 and placed twenty-first in the 50 meter freestyle with a 23.65, respectively. For his final event, the 200 meter individual medley, he won the gold medal with a Championships record and personal best time of 1:59.01, which lowered the mark 0.50 seconds from the 1:59.51 it was set at in 2012 by Chase Kalisz. His time also set a new National Age Group record (NAG) for the boys 15-16 age group in the event, registering as 0.44 seconds faster than the former record of 1:59.45 established in 2018 by Carson Foster.

2022 Winter Junior National Championships
In December 2022, at the 2022 Winter Junior US National Championships conducted in short course yards in Austin, Texas, Williamson swam a personal best time of 1:33.07 for the first leg of the 4×200 yard freestyle relay on day one, setting a new National Age Group record for the boys 15-16 age group in the 200 yard freestyle and lowering the former record set by Drew Kibler in 2017 by 0.23 seconds. The following evening, he swam a personal best time of 1:42.07 to place second overall in the 200 yard individual medley. Later in the same session, he achieved a personal best time of 19.82 seconds in the final of the 50 yard freestyle. He won three events for his locality, the West edition, the next day, including the 400 yard individual medley with a boys 15-16 National Age Group record of 3:39.83 that was over two full seconds faster than the former record set approximately 20 years earlier, the 200-yard freestyle with a 1:33.60, and the 100 yard backstroke with a personal best time of 46.90 seconds.

For the fourth and meet-concluding finals session, Williamson won the 200 yard backstroke with a personal best time of 1:40.88, which was a 2.04 second drop from his previous personal best time of 1:42.92 and registered as a new boys 15-16 National Age Group record, improving on the former record of 1:40.90 by Ryan Murphy by 0.02 seconds. He subsequently won the 100 yard freestyle with personal best time of 42.61 seconds before going on to swim another personal best time of 42.49 for 100 yard lead-off leg of the 4×100 yard freestyle relay.

2023
For his second Texas High School 6A State Championships, held in February 2023, Williamson competed for Keller High School and won individual titles in the 100 yard backstroke and 200 yard individual medley with times of 47.24 seconds and 1:42.17, respectively.

International championships

Personal best times

Long course meters (50 m pool)

Short course yards (25 yd pool)

National age group records

Long course meters (50 m pool)

Short course yards (25 yd pool)

Legend: r – relay 1st leg

Awards and honors
 Swimming World, Performance of the Week: December 10, 2021
 Arena, Swim of the Week: May 6, 2022
 Swimming World, Up & Comers: January 2022

References

2006 births
Living people
Swimmers from Texas
American male medley swimmers
American male freestyle swimmers
21st-century American people